The Escola Portuguesa de Arte Equestre (Portuguese School of Equestrian Art) is a Portuguese institution dedicated to the preservation of the equestrian arts, in the Portuguese tradition. It is one of the "Big Four", the most prestigious classical riding academies in the world.

History

The school's origins as an institution trace to 1726, during the reign of King João V of Portugal, as the Real Academia Equestre da Corte (Royal Equestrian Academy of the Portuguese Royal Court), which served as the riding school of the Portuguese Royal Family and the Portuguese nobility. However, prior to its formal creation, the riding school of the Portuguese Royal Family had long been one of the most respected in Europe, since the publication of the seminal "Bem Cavalgar" by King Duarte I of Portugal in 1438.

During the reign of King José I of Portugal, the 4th Marquis of Marialva served as the Estribeiro-Mor (Master of the Horse) of the royal household and the Equestrian Academy of the Court. Marialva pioneered the Portuguese tradition of equestrianism (sometimes called the Marialva Tradition or Arte Marialva) and is considered a founding father to the school and the Portuguese tradition. Likewise, his 1790 work "Luz da Liberal e Nobre Arte da Cavallaria" is considered the magnum opus of study in the school to this day.

In 1807, the Equestrian Academy of the Court was transformed into the Real Picaria Portuguesa (Royal Portuguese Riding Academy). In 1821, the school and its property nationalized and made into an institution of the state and not of the royal family. Samuel Lupi became Director of the Real Picaria Portuguesa in 1855 and later the private instructor to King Carlos I of Portugal. However, it was during the reign of King Carlos I that the Real Picaria became dormant, at the end of the 19th century.

Throughout the dormant period of the school's history, the Portuguese tradition was practiced and maintained in private equestrian academies and picadeiros. The school's history restarted in 1979, with the founding of the Escola Portuguesa da Arte Equestre as the successor institution of the Real Picaria Portuguesa.

Mission

The primary directives of the Portuguese School of Equestrian Art are the conservation of the Lusitano horse, also known as the Pure Blood Lusitano, and the maintenance of classical Portuguese Baroque horsemanship. The Lusitano is an Iberian horse of Baroque stock famed for its prominence and strength in dressage and Portuguese-style bullfighting. It is the goal of the Portuguese School to preserve classical dressage (Haute ecole) of the Portuguese tradition.

Administration
The academy and training grounds of the Portuguese School are based at Queluz National Palace, in Sintra, on the Portuguese Riviera, outside of Lisbon. The school also maintains the Picadeiro Henrique Calado riding hall in Belém, Lisbon, originally built in 1833 for Queen Maria II of Portugal's Lancers Regiment.

The academy consists of 17 riders, called cavaleiros ("horsemen" or "knights"). The Director of the Portuguese School is Lt. Col. Paulo Candoso. The school's Mestre Picador Chefe (Chief Master Rider) is currently João Pedro Rodrigues.

Horses
The Portuguese School of Equestrian Art exclusively uses Lusitano horses bred from the Alter Real State Stud, established in 1748 by King João V of Portugal to provide horses for use by the Portuguese Royal Family and by the Royal Equestrian Academy. Lusitanos were used by the royal family for performing classical dressage and competing in the Jogos da Corte, the Royal Court Games (tournaments held between the 16th and 19th centuries to commemorate festivities).

See also
Lusitano
Alter Real State Stud
Spanish Riding School of Austria
Royal Andalusian School of Equestrian Art of Spain
Cadre Noir of France

References

External links

 
 Alter Real Stud Farm official website

Equestrian educational establishments
Education in Portugal
Education in Sintra
Dressage schools and teams
Portuguese culture